Panyembrama is a secular Balinese dance form designed by I Wayan Berata and first performed in 1971. It includes movements from several sacral Balinese dances, which it was intended to replace for performance in front of tourists.

History
Traditional Balinese dances are sacral in nature, and thus unsuited for secular performances. That these dances were used for welcoming non-Balinese, and in non-sacral contexts, was a point of controversy in the late 1960s. A secular dance was needed, one which could be used outside of the temples, particularly for tourists, and thus maintain the sacredness of the original dances. Panyembrama was one of several dance forms, including oleg tamulilingan, which arose from this situation and was intended for non-Balinese (particularly Western) audiences.

I Wayan Beratha, a choreographer with the Karawitan Conservatory (Indonesian: Konservatori Karawitan) who was well-versed in traditional Balinese dance, was tasked by his organisation to create a new, secular dance.  To create what would become panyembrama, Beratha combined the most beautiful moves of traditional dances such as legong, condong, and pendet. Ethnomusicologist Zachar Laskewicz writes that the continued inspiration of these dances allows similar texts to be interpreted from the panyembrama performance. This basis in traditional dance has also led to panyembrama being classified as a form of classical dance by the art critic A. M. Hermin Kusmayati.

Panyembrama was first performed in 1971, at the Pandan Festival. This dance form has been taught at Balinese dance schools, and been used at temples in religious ceremonies, as a sort of welcoming dance for the gods.

Performance
 
The name panyembrama, from the Balinese word sambrama, means "welcome". This is reflective of its purpose as a welcoming dance. In lengthy events, the dance is usually performed first, particularly before a secularised legong dance.

The dancers – always young women – come onstage carrying a metal (usually silver or aluminium) dish with incense and flowers in it. These dancers, numbering two or more, wear layered clothing, decorated with a golden pattern called prada. Around their bodies they wear a kamben (sarong), as well a tightly wrapped cloth which covers from their chest to their waist. On their heads they wear golden headdresses and frangipani flowers.

To open the panyembrama dance, the performers kneel, as if praying.  They make welcoming movements to the guests, accompanied by gamelan. Their movements are slow, accentuating the curves of the dancers' bodies. At the end of the performance, the dancers move in circles, throwing flowers at each other and the audience, with the scents being carried in the air. Unlike some other Balinese dances, panyembrama is not intended to convey a story.

See also

 Bedhaya
 Legong
 Pendet
 Balinese dance

References

Works cited

External links

Dances of Bali
20th-century dance